Kim B. Bruce is an American computer scientist. He is the Reuben C. and Eleanor Winslow Professor of Computer Science at Pomona College, and was previously the Frederick Latimer Wells Professor of Computer Science at Williams College. He helped establish the computer science departments at both institutions. His work focuses on the design of programming languages.

Early life and education 
Bruce attended Pomona College. He then received his doctorate from the University of Wisconsin–Madison.

Career 

Bruce was the Frederick Latimer Wells Professor of Computer Science at Williams College for 28 years. He then moved to teach at his alma mater, Pomona.

References

External links
Faculty page at Pomona College

Year of birth missing (living people)
Living people
Pomona College faculty
American computer scientists
Williams College faculty
Pomona College alumni
University of Wisconsin–Madison alumni